Central Railway or Central Railroad can refer to the following:

Africa
Central East African Railways, in Malawi
Central South African Railways, in South Africa

Asia
Bombay, Baroda and Central India Railway, in India
Central Asian Railway, also called the Trans-Caspian Railway, in Russia
Central China Railway (華中鐵道股份有限公司, Huázhōng Tiědào Gǔfèn Yǒuxiàn Gōngsī), in east-central China
Central Japan Railway Company (東海旅客鉄道株式会社, Tōkai Ryokaku Tetsudō Kabushiki-gaisha), in Chūbu (Nagoya) region, Japan
Central Plains Metropolitan Region intercity railway, around Zhengzhou, China
Central Railway (India), now the Indian Railways' Central Railway zone
Central Railway Building, headquarters of the Bangladesh Railway, in India
 Central Salsette Tramway, also called the Salsette–Trombay Railway, in Mumbai, India
Chennai Central–Bangalore City line, in India
North Central Railway College, a school in Uttar Pradesh, India
Sha Tin to Central Link, a rapid transit project in Hong Kong

Europe

United Kingdom
Anglesey Central Railway in Wales
Belfast Central Railway, in Belfast, Northern Ireland
Central London Railway, an underground railway in London, England
Central Railway (UK), a proposed freight line
Central railway station (London), in east London
Central Trains, a train operating company 
Central Wales Extension Railway, in Wales
Derry Central Railway, in County Londonderry, Northern Ireland
East Fife Central Railway in Scotland
Forest of Dean Central Railway, in Gloucestershire, England
Glasgow Central Railway, in Scotland
Great Central Railway
Great Central Railway, in England
Great Central Railway (heritage railway), in Leicestershire, England
Great Central Railway (Nottingham), in Nottinghamshire, England
Great Central Main Line, the historical route these companies follow(ed)
Great Western and Great Central Joint Railway, in south east England
Hull and Barnsley and Great Central Joint Railway, also called the Gowdall and Braithwell Railway, in England
Isle of Wight Central Railway, in England
Scottish Central Railway, in Scotland
Waterford & Central Ireland Railway, in Northern Ireland

Elsewhere
Central Railway Metro station, in Sofia, Bulgaria
Central Swabian Railway (Mittelschwabenbahn), in Bavaria, Germaqny
Grand Crimean Central Railway, in Crimea, Russia
Swiss Central Railway (Schweizerische Centralbahn), in Switzerland
Württemberg Central Railway (Zentralbahn or Centralbahn), in Baden-Württemberg, Germany
Zentralbahn, Switzerland

North America

Canada
Algoma Central Railway, in Ontario
Canada Central Railway, in Ontario
Cape Breton and Central Nova Scotia Railway, in Nova Scotia
Central Maine and Quebec Railway, in Quebec and the Northeastern United States
Central Manitoba Railway, in the Manitoba
Central Ontario Railway, in Ontario
Huron Central Railway, in Ontario
Maine Central Railroad Company, in New Brunswick, Quebec, and the Northeastern United States
Michigan Central Railroad, in Ontario and the Northern United States
New York Central Railroad, in Ontario and the Northern United States
Nipissing Central Railway, in Ontario
Ottawa Central Railway, in Ontario
Prairie Dog Central Railway, near Winnipeg, Manitoba
Quebec Central Railway, in Quebec
Waterloo Central Railway, in Ontario

Mexico
Mexican Central Railway (Ferrocarril Central Mexicano)

United States

Alabama
Alabama Central Railroad
Central of Georgia Railway
Illinois Central Railroad
Illinois Central Gulf Railroad

Alaska
Alaska Central Railroad

Arizona
Arizona Central Railroad

Arkansas
Illinois Central Railroad
Illinois Central Gulf Railroad

California
California Central Railway
Central California Traction Company
Central Oregon and Pacific Railroad
Central Pacific Railroad

Colorado
Argentine Central Railway
Colorado Central Railroad

Connecticut
Central New England Railway
Central Vermont Railway
New England Central Railroad

Delaware
Delmarva Central Railroad

Florida
Florida Central and Peninsular Railroad
Florida Central Railroad (1868–1882)
Florida Central Railroad (1907–1914)
Florida Central Railroad (current)
South Central Florida Railroad Florida

Georgia
Central of Georgia Railway
Georgia Central Railway

Illinois
American Central Railway
Central Illinois Railroad
Chicago Central and Pacific Railroad
Illinois Central Railroad
Illinois Central Gulf Railroad
Lee County Central Electric Railway
Michigan Central Railroad
New York Central Railroad
Prairie Central Railway

Indiana
Central Indiana and Western Railroad
Central Railroad of Indiana
Central Railroad of Indianapolis
Illinois Central Railroad
Illinois Central Gulf Railroad
Indiana Central Railway
Michigan Central Railroad
New York Central Railroad

Iowa
Central Iowa Railway Iowa
Chicago Central and Pacific Railroad
Illinois Central Railroad
Illinois Central Gulf Railroad

Kansas
Central Branch Union Pacific Railroad
Central Kansas Railway

Kentucky
Illinois Central Railroad
Illinois Central Gulf Railroad

Louisiana
Illinois Central Railroad
Illinois Central Gulf Railroad

Maine
Central Maine and Quebec Railway
Maine Central Railroad Company

Maryland
Delmarva Central Railroad
Maryland Central Railroad
Northern Central Railway
Philadelphia and Baltimore Central Railroad
West Virginia Central and Pittsburg Railway

Massachusetts
Central Massachusetts Railroad
Central New England Railway
Central Vermont Railway
New England Central Railroad
New York Central Railroad

Michigan
Central Michigan Railroad
Great Lakes Central Railroad
Illinois Central Railroad
Michigan Central Railroad
New York Central Railroad

Mississippi
Alabama Central Railroad
Illinois Central Railroad
Illinois Central Gulf Railroad
Mississippi Central Railroad (1852-1874)
Mississippi Central Railroad (1904-1967)

Missouri
Central Midland Railway
Illinois Central Railroad
Illinois Central Gulf Railroad

Montana
Central Montana Rail, Inc.
Montana Central Railway

Nebraska
Nebraska Central Railroad

Nevada
Central Pacific Railroad
Nevada Central Railroad

New Hampshire
Central Vermont Railway
Maine Central Railroad Company

New Jersey
Central Railroad of New Jersey, also called the Jersey Central Railroad
Jersey Central Traction Company
New York Central Railroad

New York
Central Branch (Long Island Rail Road)
Central City Railway, in Syracuse
Central New England Railway
Central New York Railroad
Central Vermont Railway
New York Central Railroad
Rockland Central Railroad

Ohio
Central Ohio Railroad
Central Railroad of Indiana
New York Central Railroad
Ohio Central Railroad (1988)
Ohio Central Railroad System
Toledo and Ohio Central Railway

Oklahoma
Enid Central Railway
North Central Oklahoma Railway
Oklahoma Central Railway (1905-1914)
Oklahoma Central Railroad (1914–1942)

Oregon
Central Oregon and Pacific Railroad
Columbia River and Oregon Central Railroad
Oregon Central Rail Road

Pennsylvania
Central New York Railroad
Central Railroad of Pennsylvania
Central Railroad of Pennsylvania (1891–1918)
Central Railroad of New Jersey, also called the Jersey Central Railroad
Maryland Central Railroad
New York Central Railroad
Northern Central Railway
Ohio Central Railroad System
Philadelphia and Baltimore Central Railroad

Tennessee
Central of Tennessee Railway and Navigation Company
Illinois Central Railroad
Illinois Central Gulf Railroad
Mississippi Central Railroad (1852-1874)
Tennessee Central Railway

Texas
Central Texas and Colorado River Railway
Houston and Texas Central Railway
Texas Central Railway

Utah
Central Pacific Railroad
Utah Central Railroad (1869–1881)
Utah Central Railway (1992), in the Ogden area

Vermont
Central Maine and Quebec Railway
Central Vermont Railway
Maine Central Railroad Company
New England Central Railroad

Virginia
Delmarva Central Railroad
Virginia Central Railroad
Virginia Central Railway

Washington
Central Washington Railroad

West Virginia
New York Central Railroad
West Virginia Central and Pittsburg Railway

Wisconsin
Wisconsin Central Railroad (1871–1899)
Wisconsin Central Railway (1897–1954)
Wisconsin Central Railroad (1954–1961)

Wyoming
Colorado Central Railroad
Wyoming Central Railway

Oceania
Central Australia Railway, in Australia
Central Coast & Newcastle Line, a passenger route in New South Wales, Australia
Central Highlands Tourist Railway, in Victoria, Australia
Central Western railway line, Queensland, in Queensland, Australia
Otago Central Railway, on the South Island of New Zealand

South America
Buenos Aires Central Railway (Ferrocarril Central Buenos Aires), in Argentina
Central Argentine Railway, in Argentina
Central Chubut Railway, in Argentina
Central Entre Ríos Railway, in Entre Ríos Province, Argentina
Central Northern Railway, in Argentina
Central Uruguay Railway, in Uruguay
Córdoba Central Railway, in Argentina
Estrada de Ferro Central do Brasil (Central Railway of Brazil), in Brazil
Ferrocarril Central Andino (Andean Central Railway), in Peru
Nuevo Central Argentino, a train operating company in Argentina

See also
Central Railway Station (disambiguation)
Central Line (disambiguation)
Great Central Railway (disambiguation)
Grand Central (disambiguation)